Zuyevka is a town and the administrative center of Zuyevsky District in Kirov Oblast, Russia, located  east of Kirov, the administrative center of the oblast. Population:

History
It was founded in 1899 as a settlement servicing the construction of the Perm–Kotlas railway. It was named after a nearby eponymous village. Town status was granted to it in 1944.

Administrative and municipal status
Within the framework of administrative divisions, Zuyevka serves as the administrative center of Zuyevsky District. As an administrative division, it is incorporated within Zuyevsky District as the Town of Zuyevka. As a municipal division, the Town of Zuyevka is incorporated within Zuyevsky Municipal District as Zuyevskoye Urban Settlement.

References

Notes

Sources

External links

Official website of Zuyevka 
Zuyevka Business Directory  

Cities and towns in Kirov Oblast